Dürrenstein may refer to:
 Dürrenstein (Austria)
 Dürrenstein (South Tyrol), Italy
 Dursztyn, a village in Poland